Kurt Heegner (16 December 1893 – 2 February 1965) was a German private scholar from Berlin, who specialized in 
radio engineering and mathematics. He is famous for his mathematical discoveries in number theory and, in particular, the Stark–Heegner theorem.

Life and career
Heegner was born and died in Berlin.  In 1952, he published the Stark–Heegner theorem which he claimed was the solution to a classic number theory problem proposed by the great mathematician Gauss, the class number 1 problem. Heegner's work was not accepted for years, mainly due to his quoting of a portion of Heinrich Martin Weber's work that was known to be incorrect (though he never used this result in the proof).

Heegner's proof was accepted as essentially correct after a 1967 announcement by Bryan Birch, and definitively resolved by a paper by Harold Stark that had been delayed in publication until 1969 (Stark had independently arrived at a similar proof, but disagrees with the common notion that his proof is "more or less the same" as Heegner's). Stark attributed Heegner's mistakes to the fact he used a textbook by Weber that contained some results with incomplete proofs.

The book The Legacy of Leonhard Euler: A Tricentennial Tribute by Lokenath Debnath claims on page 64, that Heegner was a "retired Swiss mathematician", but he appears to have been neither Swiss nor retired at the time of his 1952 paper.

See also
List of amateur mathematicians
Stark–Heegner theorem
Heegner number
Heegner point
Heegner's lemma

Literature

References

External links
Heegner's entry in "Foundation for German communication and related technologies"

1893 births
1965 deaths
20th-century German mathematicians